A spring creek is a stream that flows from a spring.

Spring Creek may also refer to any of the following specific places:

Australia 
Spring Creek, Queensland (Banana Shire)
Spring Creek, Queensland (Darling Downs), a locality split between Toowoomba Region and Southern Downs Region in southeastern Queensland
Spring Creek, Queensland (Lockyer Valley Region)
Spring Creek, former name of Graytown, Victoria

Canada
Spring Creek (Lake Erie), a watershed administered by the Long Point Region Conservation Authority, that drains into Lake Erie
Spring Creek (Grenadier Pond), a tributary to Grenadier Pond, see Wendigo Creek

New Zealand 
Spring Creek, New Zealand, a township near Blenheim, New Zealand

United States

Settlements 
Spring Creek, Minnesota, an unincorporated community
Spring Creek Township, Becker County, Minnesota
Spring Creek Township, Norman County, Minnesota
Spring Creek, Missouri, a ghost town
Spring Creek Township, Custer County, Nebraska
Spring Creek, Nevada, a census-designated place
Spring Creek, Brooklyn, New York
Spring Creek, North Carolina, in Madison County, NC
Spring Creek, Oklahoma, an unincorporated community
Spring Creek Township, Elk County, Pennsylvania
Spring Creek Township, Warren County, Pennsylvania
Spring Creek, South Dakota, a census-designated place
Spring Creek, West Virginia, an unincorporated community

Waterways

California
Spring Creek (Sonoma County, California)
Spring Creek (Shasta County, California), a main tributary of the Fall River
Spring Creek (San Mateo County, California), a tributary of Laguna Creek in San Mateo County

Colorado
Spring Creek (Fort Collins, Colorado), a tributary of the Cache La Poudre River

Delaware
Spring Creek (Murderkill River tributary), in Kent County

Georgia
Spring Creek (Flint River tributary)

Illinois
Spring Creek (Macon County, Illinois), a tributary of Stevens Creek
Spring Creek (Sangamon County, Illinois), a tributary of the Sangamon River

Minnesota
Spring Creek (Minnesota), a headwater to the Yellow Medicine River

Missouri
Spring Creek (Big Piney River tributary) in Texas and Phelps counties
Spring Creek (Bourbeuse River tributary)
Spring Creek (Bryant Creek tributary), in Douglas and Ozark counties
Spring Creek (Chariton River tributary), in Putnam, Sullivan and Adair counties
Spring Creek (Dent County, Missouri)
Spring Creek (Eleven Point River tributary)
Spring Creek (Gasconade River tributary)
Spring Creek (North Fork River tributary), in Douglas and Howell counties
Spring Creek (Shoal Creek tributary)
Spring Creek (Stoddard County, Missouri)

Nebraska
Spring Creek (Redbird Creek tributary), Holt County
Spring Creek (Brush Creek tributary), Holt County

Nevada
Spring Creek (West Deep Creek tributary)

North Carolina
Spring Creek, Madison County, North Carolina

North Dakota
Spring Creek (North Dakota), a tributary of the Knife River

Ohio
Spring Creek (Great Miami River tributary)

Oklahoma
Spring Creek (Beaver River Tributary)
Spring Creek (Neosho River Tributary)
Spring Creek in Caddo County, Oklahoma, impounded for Chickasha Lake and a tributary of the Washita River
Spring Creek in Roger Mills County, Oklahoma, impounded for Spring Creek Lake (Oklahoma) and a tributary of the Washita River
Spring Creek in Washita County, Oklahoma, a tributary of Cobb Creek

Pennsylvania
Spring Creek (Bald Eagle Creek tributary)
Spring Creek (Clarion River), a tributary of the Clarion River in Elk County
Spring Creek (Little Lehigh Creek tributary)
Spring Creek (Susquehanna River tributary)
Spring Creek (Tulpehocken Creek), a tributary of Tulpehocken Creek (Pennsylvania) in Berks County
Spring Creek (White Deer Hole Creek tributary), in Lycoming County and Union County
Spring Creek (Brokenstraw Creek tributary), in Warren County

Tennessee
Spring Creek (Roaring River tributary), in Putnam, Overton and Jackson counties

Texas
Spring Creek (Harris County, Texas), terminates in Lake Houston in Harris County
Spring Creek (Victoria County, Texas)
Spring Creek (Tom Green County, Texas), an inflow of the Twin Buttes Reservoir in Tom Green County

West Virginia
Spring Creek (Little Kanawha River tributary)

Wisconsin
Spring Creek (Waupaca River tributary)

Other places 
Spring Creek Correctional Center, a state prison in Seward, Alaska
Spring Creek Dam, Shasta County, California
Spring Creek Forest Preserve, Garland, Texas
Spring Creek (Ontario), headwaters for Heart Lake (Ontario)
Spring Creek Park, New York City, New York
Starrett City, Brooklyn (formerly Spring Creek Towers), New York

See also 
Spring Creek Township (disambiguation)
Spring Creek Lake (disambiguation)